M/V Pool Fisher was a British merchant vessel that sank off the Isle of Wight on 6 November 1979 with the loss of most of her crew.

Service history
Pool Fisher  was built in Holland and launched in 1959.

Loss
On 3 November 1979 Pool Fisher arrived at Hamburg from Norway in ballast. She had a crew of 15, and one passenger, the wife of the Chief Engineer, aboard. At about 13:00 the same day she sailed from Hamburg carrying 1,250 tonnes of muriate of potash in bulk, bound for Runcorn.

At 22:50 on 5 November the Esso Penzance sighted Pool Fisher about eleven miles south of Brighton, steering erratically and seemingly down by the head, in heavy seas. At 05:47 on 6 November the coast radio station at Niton received a Mayday call from Pool Fisher. Within minutes Niton passed the information to the coastguard, which immediately alerted the Yarmouth and Bembridge lifeboats and scrambled SAR helicopters from Lee-on-Solent, and later from Portland and Culdrose. The search and rescue operation was carried out, in severe weather conditions, by three Royal Navy warships, including , six merchant vessels and two lifeboats, assisted by four helicopters.

The only two survivors from Pool Fisher, deckhands Donald Crane and Mark Fook, were both off-watch and asleep below when they were roused by the bosun and ordered on deck. By the time they arrived there the ship was listing heavily to port, and both were washed off the deck by heavy seas. They were finally rescued by helicopters of the Fleet Air Arm after spending over five hours holding on to cargo hatch boards from the sunken ship. Both were suffering from severe hypothermia and were taken to Haslar Naval Hospital for treatment.

The court of inquiry concluded that her sinking was due to the failure of the No.1 hatch, which had only three hatch locking wires fitted, instead the eight required, and some of her securing cleats were defective. This allowed the rapid entry of a large quantity of water into the hold, first putting her down by the head and then causing her to list, and then capsize. Responsibility for this failure was placed on her Master, John Maclaren Stewart, and the Mate, Francis William Cooper, neither of whom survived.

References

External links
 

1959 ships
Ships built in the Netherlands
Merchant ships of the United Kingdom
Shipwrecks in the English Channel
Wreck diving sites in the United Kingdom
1979 disasters in the United Kingdom
Maritime incidents in 1979